Ewald Mertens (24 September 1909 – 7 February 1965) was a German middle-distance runner. He competed in the men's 800 metres at the 1936 Summer Olympics. He was awarded an Honoured Master of Sport. He died in a hospital in Berlin after a long illness.

References

External links
 

1909 births
1965 deaths
Athletes (track and field) at the 1936 Summer Olympics
German male middle-distance runners
Olympic athletes of Germany
Place of birth missing
Recipients of the Honoured Master of Sport